The  2014 Men's EuroHockey Junior Championship II was the ninth edition of the Men's EuroHockey Junior Championship II, the second level of the men's European under-21 field hockey championships organized by the European Hockey Federation. It was held from 13 to 19 July 2014 in Lousada, Portugal.

Ireland won their second EuroHockey Junior Championship II title and were promoted to the 2017 Men's EuroHockey Junior Championship together with the hosts and runners-up Portugal.

Results

Preliminary round

Pool A

Pool B

Second round
The points obtained in the preliminary round against the other team are taken over.

Pool C

Pool D

Final standings

See also
2014 Men's EuroHockey Junior Championship
2014 Men's EuroHockey Junior Championship III
2014 Women's EuroHockey Junior Championship II

References

Men's EuroHockey Junior Championship II
Junior 2
International field hockey competitions hosted by Portugal
EuroHockey Junior Championship II
EuroHockey Junior Championship II
Sport in Lousada